Niki Jenkins (born July 27, 1973 in Selkirk, Manitoba) is a female judoka from Canada. She competed for Canada at the 1996 Summer Olympics and won a silver medal in the Women's Half-Heavyweight (under 78 kg) division at the 1999 Pan American Games. She trained with the Shidokan Judo Club in Montréal.

She is married to Neil Adams and has two daughters, Brooke and Taylor, and lives in Rugby.

See also
Judo in Canada
List of Canadian judoka

References

1973 births
Canadian female judoka
Judoka at the 1996 Summer Olympics
Judoka at the 1999 Pan American Games
Living people
Olympic judoka of Canada
Sportspeople from Selkirk, Manitoba
Pan American Games silver medalists for Canada
Pan American Games medalists in judo
Medalists at the 1999 Pan American Games
20th-century Canadian women
21st-century Canadian women